TAT-3 was the third transatlantic telephone cable, in operation from 1963 to 1986. It had 414 kHz of bandwidth, allowing it to carry 138 telephone circuits (simultaneous calls). It was owned by AT&T and GPO (now BT). It cost £12m  in 1960

References

AT&T buildings
British Telecom buildings and structures
Infrastructure completed in 1963
Science and technology in Cornwall
Transatlantic communications cables
United Kingdom–United States relations
1963 establishments in England
1963 establishments in New Jersey
1986 disestablishments in England
1986 disestablishments in New Jersey